Robert Weiss is an American ballet dancer, choreographer, and Artistic Director of Carolina Ballet.  He began his professional career at age 17 joining the New York City Ballet under George Balanchine, eventually becoming a Principal Dancer sometime prior to 1977. Balanchine created several roles for him, including Ballo della Regina.  Weiss remained with the New York City Ballet for 16 years. He later served as Artistic Director of the Pennsylvania Ballet from 1982 to 1990. Weiss then became the founding Artistic Director of Carolina Ballet in 1997 where he has remained to this day.

Artistic credits 
Notable choreography credits include:
 Messiah
 Carmen
 The Kreutzer Sonata
 Romeo & Juliet
 Stravinsky's Clowns
  Don Quixote

References

External links 
 Carolina Ballet: Biography, Artistic Director Robert Weiss
 Pennsylvania Ballet: Company History and Overview
 An Interview with Robert Weiss
 Dance; To Found a Troupe, It Took a Real Trouper, on The New York Times, By Terry Teachout, Jan 30, 2000, Section 2, Page 8 of the National edition

American male ballet dancers
Ballet choreographers
New York City Ballet principal dancers
Living people
Dance in North Carolina
Year of birth missing (living people)